Francis Quinn (12 September 1926 – 18 October 2008) was a Scottish professional footballer who played as an outside right for Celtic, Dundee United, Hamilton Academical, Cowdenbeath and Stranraer.

Born in Saltcoats, Ayrshire, Quinn played for local junior club Saltcoats Victoria before turning senior with Celtic in November 1946. Having failed to become a first team regular, he was released in 1948, joining Dundee United on a free transfer on 18 August 1948. He scored a hat trick for the reserve team on the same day. After making his first team debut against Alloa Athletic on 1 September, he quickly established himself, becoming part of a celebrated forward line known as the "Famous Five". Despite playing on the wing he was also a regular goalscorer, scoring over twenty goals in each of four consecutive seasons and finishing as United's leading scorer in the 1952-53 season. He was released by the club in May 1954, subsequently signing for Hamilton.

Quinn died in Saltcoats in 2008. He was posthumously inducted into the Dundee United Hall of Fame in 2016.

References

1926 births
2008 deaths
Scottish footballers
Association football wingers
Celtic F.C. players
Dundee United F.C. players
Hamilton Academical F.C. players
Cowdenbeath F.C. players
Stranraer F.C. players
Scottish Football League players
People from Saltcoats
Saltcoats Victoria F.C. players
Scottish Junior Football Association players